The strada statale 310 "del Bidente" (SS 310) was an Italian state road, created in 1962 and disestablished in 2000. It began in Campaldino and ended in Ronco by Forlì, going through the Apennine Mountains between Tuscany and Emilia-Romagna.

History 
The road was created in 1959 with the following route: "Junction with the state road nr. 70 in Campaldino – Pratovecchio - Stia - Passo della Calla - Santa Sofia - Galeata - Civitella di Romagna – Junction with the state road n. 9 in Ronco." The road was called "del Bidente", from the name of the parallel river.

In 1998 the government decided to devolve to the Regions all the state roads that were not considered of "national importance". The list of those roads, compiled in 2000, defined the state road nr. 310 of "regional interest", and therefore it was devolved to the Tuscany and Emilia-Romagna region.

References

External links 

310
Transport in Tuscany
Transport in Emilia-Romagna
1962 establishments in Italy
2000 disestablishments in Italy